Football in Yemen is run by the Yemen Football Association. The association administers the Yemen national football team, as well as the Yemeni League.

Football (soccer) is the most popular sport in Yemen.  The Yemen national football team competes in the FIFA and AFC leagues. The country also hosts many football clubs that compete nationally and internationally.

Yemen hosted the 20th Arabian Gulf Cup in Aden in 2010. Yemen was thought to be the strongest competitor, but was defeated in the first three rounds.

The development of football in Yemen is often thought to be held by back many of Yemen's internal problems such as terrorist attack threats, political tension between the North and South, an unstable economy, and a high illiteracy rate.

The Yemeni national team has never won a championship, though it includes several renowned Arab players, including striker Ali Al-Nono who is the highest goal-scorer for the Yemeni League and has played in the top division of Bahrain and Syria.

Popularity

Despite boasting a population of over 20,000,000 inhabitants, Yemen has only 9,200 registered players. Many of the clubs in the Yemeni League offer free admission to their matches, but despite this incentive attendance is declining and support is waning.

Broadcasting

While football is the most popular sport in Yemen, its domestic league is overshadowed by the more popular European leagues of Spain's La Liga which Yemenis prefer to watch and support.

Civil unrest (2015-present) 

Due to the Yemeni Civil War, football in Yemen has stood at a standstill at a professional level. The Yemeni League hasn't been active since 2014 despite the national team playing in competitions. It is unlikely that football in Yemen will continue professionally in the near future however popularity among locals in amateur matches still thrive.

National team

Yemen's greatest football achievement is qualifying for the  2019 AFC Asian Cup.

Football stadiums in Yemen 

Note that many stadiums in Yemen are damaged because of the war.

See also

 List of football clubs in Yemen

References